Laportea canadensis, commonly called Canada nettle or wood-nettle, is an annual or perennial herbaceous plant of the nettle family Urticaceae, native to eastern and central North America. It is found growing in open woods with moist rich soils and along streams and in drainages.

Description
Laportea canadensis grows from tuberous roots to a height of 30 to 150 centimeters, and can be rhizomatous, growing into small clumps. Plants have both stinging and non-stinging hairs on the foliage and the stems. It has whitish green flowers, produced from spring to early fall. Unlike its cousin, the common nettle, Laportea canadensis has alternate leaves. The bulk of its foliage also grows notably high on the stem.

Sting
When the stinging nettles come in contact with the skin, the unlucky individual is dealt a painful burning stinging sensation, sometimes with barbs left in the skin. The skin can turn red and blister, and blisters can last for several days.

References

External links
Profile: Wood Nettle (Laportea canadensis) Photos, Drawings, Text. (Wild Plants of Winnipeg from Nature Manitoba)

canadensis
Flora of the Southeastern United States
Flora of the Northeastern United States
Flora of the North-Central United States
Flora of Eastern Canada
Flora of Western Canada